Torres (stylised as TORRES) is the debut studio album by Torres (Mackenzie Scott), released independently in January 2013. The album was recorded over the course of five days by Nashville audio engineer Ryan McFadden in a recording studio in Franklin, Tennessee.

Critical reception

TORRES has received generally favorable reviews from several mainstream critic websites including BPM, Pitchfork Media, and Drowned in Sound.  Metacritic, which assigns an average score based on various professional ratings, gave the album an 81/100, based on 11 reviews, indicating "universal acclaim."  Critics praised Scott's powerful, raw voice and the live, intimate recording style as notable attractions of the record. Jayson Greene of Pitchfork Media wrote, " Mackenzie Scott's voice conveys raw, urgent desperation, the sort we flinch from instinctually and are attuned, on a primal level, to heed."  Drew Malmuth of Pretty Much Amazing wrote, "TORRES is an album that is pulsating with life."

Track listing
All music and lyrics by Mackenzie Scott

Personnel
Musicians
Mackenzie Scott –  singing/voices, guitar, percussion
Chris DePorter – drums, percussion
Brady Surface – bass, synth
Mark Sloan – guitar, rhodes
Bobby Chase – violin
Larissa Maestro – cello
Natalie Prass – vocal harmonies on "November Baby"
Ryan McFadden – drum programming on "Chains" and "Don't Run Away, Emilie"

Production
Mackenzie Scott – Co-Producer
Ryan McFadden – Co-Producer, Engineer, Mixing
Andrew Darby – Mastering

Art Direction
Jess Cohen – Design, Inside Photo, Layout
Bobby Herb – Cover Photo

Releases

References

2013 debut albums
Torres (musician) albums